The New Jersey State Council on the Arts was founded in 1966 to support artistic activities in the state of New Jersey.  It is funded by the New Jersey State Legislature and the National Endowment for the Arts (NEA).

External links
 

Council on the Arts
Government agencies established in 1966
1966 establishments in New Jersey
Trenton, New Jersey